Zinovy Yefimovich Gerdt (which is a pseudonym, his real name being Zalman Afroimovich Khrapinovich (За́лман Афро́имович Храпино́вич); 21 September 1916 in Sebezh, Russian Empire – 18 November 1996) was a Soviet and Russian actor. He was awarded the People's Artist of the USSR in 1990.

Biography

Early life and education
Gerdt was born Zalman Afroimovich Khrapinovich on September 21, 1916 in the city of Sebezh in the Pskov Oblast. His father Afroim Yakovlevich Khrapinovich worked for some time in a fabrics shop as a clerk, and later as a salesman. Mother Rakhil Isaakovna was a housewife.

His father died quite early, his mother stayed with four children: two boys and two girls, of which Zinovy was the youngest.

In Sebezh he lived up to 11 years, studied at a Jewish school (cheder), knew Yiddish. After finishing school, Zinovy moved to his elder brother who lived in Moscow.

From a young age, Gerdt was fond of reading and writing poetry.

At 15, Gerdt graduated from a vocational school affiliated with the Valerian Kuybyshev Electrical Plant. He started working for Metrostroy as a metalworker-electrician. As a hobby, he was an actor the factory's Workers' Youth Theatre, also known as TRAM. In 1937, he began acting at the Puppet Theatre of Moscow House of Pioneers.

Subsequently, TRAM was transformed into the theatrical studio of Aleksei Arbuzov and Valentin Pluchek.

Since 1937, Gerdt worked in the Puppet Theater at the Moscow House of Pioneers.

Gerdt volunteered to the front when World War II began. He was enlisted as a senior lieutenant of a field engineering division and suffered a serious leg wound near Belgorod in February 1943.

Career
In 1945-1982, Gerdt was in the troupe of the Central Puppet Theater under the leadership of Sergei Obraztsov. He voiced many characters, the most famous one was the entertainer from the "Unusual Concert". He performed the role of the entertainer in different countries using the local language and was so convincing that the audiences always believed that the actor knew their language fluently: Gerdt perfectly mastered the art of onomatopoeia.

In the Central Puppet Theater under the leadership of Sergei Obraztsov, Gerdt was also busy in the plays "Devil's Mill", "Wish upon a Pike", "The Night Before Christmas", "Divine Comedy", etc.

He also played at the Sovremennik Theatre in the play "The Monument" by Anne Vetemaa staged by Valery Fokin (premiered in 1977).

Since 1983, he was an actor of the theater named after Yermolova Theatre (performance "Costume").

Zinovy Gerdt also worked in dubbing many foreign films for Soviet release.

He had his cinematic debut in 1958 in an episodic role in the film Man from planet earth. Gerdt is known primarily as a master of episodic, mostly comedic roles. In total, to actor's credit are more than 70 films.

In the 1960s, he appeared in the films Michel and Mishutka (1961), Returned Music (1964), Want-Believe, Do not Want ... (1964), The Year As Life (1965), Green Light (1965), City of Masters (1965), Avdotya Pavlovna (1966), July Rain (1966), At the Thirteenth Hour of the Night (1968), Zigzag of Success (1969) and others.

Recognition of the public came to the actor after the first major roles - Kukushkin in the film Magician (1967, directed by Pyotr Todorovsky) and Panikovsky in the film adaptation of Ilya Ilf and Yevgeny Petrov's novel The Golden Calf (1968, directed by Mikhail Schweitzer).

In the 1970s, new films appeared with the participation of Gerdt: Taymyr Calls You (1970), Urban Romance (1970), As Ilf and Petrov rode a tram (1971), Stoves of the Shop (1972), Carnival (1972), The Car, the Violin and the Dog Spot (1974), The Straw Hat (1974), The Key without the Right to Transfer (1976), The Draw (1976), Walking through the Flours (1974) ), The Twelve Chairs (1977), The Life of Beethoven (1978), Three Men in a Boat (1979), The Meeting Place Cannot Be Changed (1979).

In the 1980s and 1990s, the actor continued to act actively in films: Adam marries Eve (1980), Say a Word for the Poor Hussar (1980), Fairy tales... fairy tales... fairy tales of the old Arbat (1982), I'll wait for you (1982), Boys (1983), Military field novel (1983), Mary Poppins, Goodbye (1989), The Bindly and the King (1989), Intergirl (1989), The Inferno and the King (1989), Childhood Themes (1991), Lost in Siberia (1990), I am Ivan, you are Abram (1993), Life and Extraordinary Adventures of Private Ivan Chonkin (1994), Simple-minded (1994), Inspector (1996) and others.

Zinovy Gerdt also worked on television. He was the first host of one of the most popular Soviet television programs Kinopanorama, the first season of which was aired in 1962.

In the 1990s, he conducted the popular author's program Tea Club.

Gerdt performed as a screenwriter of the musical I Will Not Be Any More (1975).

Zinovy Gerdt died in Moscow on 18 November 1996. He was buried at the Kuntsevo Cemetery in Moscow.

Personal life
Zinovy Gerdt's first wife was Maria Ivanovna Novikova, whom he met at the theater studio. She gave him Vsevolod's son, born in 1945. With his second wife, Tatyana Pravdina, Zinovy met in the Middle East in 1960 during a theatrical tour. She was an interpreter from Arabic, who was assigned to help the theater. At first, Tatiana negatively perceived Zinovy's courtship, but then a romance ensued between them. Immediately after returning from the tour, they left their families and decided to get married. Their marriage lasted 36 years. From her first marriage, Tatyana Pravdina had a daughter - Ekaterina. Gerdt adopted her by giving her his name.

Legacy
In Kyiv, at the intersection of Proreznaya and Khreshchatyk streets, in 1998 a monument to Panikovsky (the character of the novel "The Golden Calf") was erected, the prototype of the monument was Zinovy Gerdt, who played the role of Panikovsky in the adaptation of the novel.

Zinovy Gerdt is an honorary citizen of Sebezh.

In 2004, in the park of Sebezh, where the artist's parents' home was located, a foundation stone was installed at the site of the future monument, where local poets and artists hold creative meetings.

A monument in Sebezh by sculptor Oleg Yershov in honor of Zinovy Gerdt was revealed to the public in 2011.

In 2001, the first edition of the book "Zyama - it's Gerdt!" was published, in which Gerdt is remembered by Eldar Ryazanov, Eduard Uspensky, Pyotr Todorovsky, Arkady Arkanov, Grigori Gorin, Viktor Shenderovich and others. The authors of the book are Tatyana Pravdina and Yakov Groisman.

In 2010, the publishing house Zebra E, AST published the book "Knight of Conscience" by Zinovy Gerdt. Pravdina, condemned the book as a composition of unduly attributed and inaccurate texts.

Honours and awards
 Order of the Red Star (1947)
 Honored Artist of the RSFSR (1959)
 People's Artist of the RSFSR (1969)
 Order of the Patriotic War, 1st class (1985)
 People's Artist of the USSR (1990)
Order "For Merit to the Fatherland", 3rd class (1996)
 Award Kinotavr in nomination "The Prize of the Presidential Council for the creative career" (1996)

Filmography

1961: 20,000 Leagues Across the Land as Narrator (voice)
1962: Nine Days in One Year as Narrator (voice)
1962: Seven Nannies as Shamsky
1962: The Story of a Crime (Short) as Narrator (voice)
1966: The City of Masters as Artist
1966: Year as Long as Life as Bornstedt
1968: Magician as Viktor Kukushkin
1968: The Golden Calf as Mikhail Samuelevich Panikovsky
1968: Zigzag of Success as Narrator (voice)
1970: Two Days of Miracles as Narrator (voice)
1971: Shadow as Finance minister
1972: Happy Go Lucky as 2nd professor
1972: Taming of the Fire as Arthur Matveevich Kartashov, lecturer
1972: Dauria as Tsarist General Semenov
1972: Ilf and Petrov Rode a Tram as Captain Mazuchcho, animal trainer
1974: The Straw Hat (TV Mini-Series) as monsieur Tardivo
1974: Adventures in a City that does not Exist as Counsellor (voice)
1975: The Flight of Mr. McKinley as Mr. McKinley (voice)
1976-1979: Adventures of Captain Wrongel (TV Series) as Captain Christopher Bonifatievich Wrongel (voice)
1977: The Twelve Chairs (TV miniseries) as Narrator (voice)
1977: Practical Joke as Karl Yolikov
1977: The Key That Should Not Be Handed On as Oleg Trigorievich
1979: The Meeting Place Cannot Be Changed (TV Mini-Series) as Mikhail Mikhailovich Bomze
1979: Three Men in a Boat (TV Movie) as Grave keeper
1980: The Wife Has Left as Sosed
1980: Rafferty as Alex Resser (voice)
1981: Say a Word for the Poor Hussar (TV Movie) as Lev Pertsovsky as dealer of parrots
1982: Fairy tales... fairy tales... fairy tales of the old Arbat as Christopher
1982: The Donkey's Hide as poet Orevuar
1983: Boys as associated judge
1983: Wartime Romance as Cinema Administrator
1983: Mary Poppins, Goodbye (TV Movie) as Admiral Boom
1985: The Fabulous Journey of Mr. Bilbo Baggins the Hobbit as Professor J. R. R. Tolkien's voice
1989: Intergirl as Boris Semyonovich
1989: The Drayman and the King as Arie Leib
1991: Lost in Siberia as Levenson
1993: Me Ivan, You Abraham as Zalman
1994: Life and Extraordinary Adventures of Private Ivan Chonkin as Moisei Stalin
1997: War is Over. Please Forget...

References

External links
 
 

1916 births
1996 deaths
20th-century Russian Jews
20th-century Russian male actors
People from Sebezh
People from Sebezhsky Uyezd
Honored Artists of the RSFSR
People's Artists of the RSFSR
People's Artists of the USSR
Recipients of the Order "For Merit to the Fatherland", 3rd class
Recipients of the Order of the Red Star
Jewish Russian actors
Russian Jews
Russian male film actors
Russian male stage actors
Russian male voice actors
Russian puppeteers
Russian television presenters
Soviet Jews
Soviet male film actors
Soviet male stage actors
Soviet male voice actors
Soviet military personnel of World War II
Soviet puppeteers
Soviet television presenters
Burials at Kuntsevo Cemetery